Frankley services is a motorway service station on the M5 motorway between Junctions 3 (A456, Quinton Interchange) and 4 (A38, Lydiate Ash), near Birmingham, and taking its name from the nearby village of Frankley.

History
It is owned by Moto. It was one of the first service stations of its kind when it was opened in 1966 by Granada Motorway Services to serve the new motorway which by 1977 gave the Midlands an unbroken motorway link with Devon. 

The £612,000 contract for the site was awarded on 22 December 1964 to Higgs and Hill. It was planned to be finished by the end of 1965. It was Granada's second motorway service station, after Toddington; its third would be Heston in 1968. There would be room for 640 people in the restaurants, and 300 parking spaces.

The 2019 Motorway Services User Survey found that Frankley's southbound side was in the bottom five motorway services in the UK for customer satisfaction.

Structure
It has been updated over the years and fitted with new retail and fast food outlets, but the original building remains intact. It is in Bromsgrove District; it marks the northernmost point of the M5 in Worcestershire; to the north is the Metropolitan Borough of Dudley, and to the north-east is Birmingham. Nearby New Frankley, to the south, is one of only two civil parishes in Birmingham. 

It is possible to enter both sides of the service station from Bartley Green. It is inadvisable to drive onto the South side, however the North non-motorway entrance is possible.

Electric car charging
There is one electric car charging point at the Northbound services, and one at the Southbound services. Both are operated by Gridserve.

References

External links 
Moto Official Site - Frankley
Motorway Services Online - Frankley
Motorway Services Info - Frankley

1966 establishments in England
Bromsgrove
Buildings and structures in Worcestershire
Commercial buildings completed in 1966
Economy of Worcestershire
M5 motorway service stations
Moto motorway service stations
Transport in Worcestershire
Transport infrastructure completed in 1966